Jaime Jordán de Urríes Fernández (born 2 February 1977 in Oviedo, Asturias), known as simply Jaime, is a Spanish retired footballer who played as a midfielder.

External links
 
 Futbolme profile 

1977 births
Living people
Footballers from Oviedo
Spanish footballers
Association football midfielders
La Liga players
Segunda División players
Segunda División B players
Tercera División players
Real Oviedo Vetusta players
Real Oviedo players
UD Salamanca players
SD Eibar footballers
Marino de Luanco footballers
Spain under-21 international footballers